Matilija Creek is a major stream in Ventura County in the U.S. state of California. It joins with North Fork Matilija Creek to form the Ventura River. Many tributaries feed the mostly free flowing,  creek, which is largely contained in the Matilija Wilderness. Matilija was one of the Chumash rancherias under the jurisdiction of Mission San Buenaventura. The meaning of the Chumash name is unknown.

Course
From its headwaters south of Sespe Creek in the Matilija Wilderness in Santa Barbara County, the creek flows east then south through a narrow V-shaped canyon into Ventura County. Below Matilija Falls it turns east and receives the Upper North Fork from the left, and almost immediately below that the West Fork (Murietta Canyon) from the right. Below the dam the creek flows southeast, through Matilija Hot Springs, and meets the North Fork Matilija Creek at the hamlet of Ojala, forming the Ventura River.

The smaller North Fork Matilija Creek flows west and south from its headwaters near Rose Valley. The North Fork runs southwest, along Forest Route 6N31, and receives Cannon Creek from the right and Bear Creek from the left. It then cascades through the narrow Wheeler Gorge and through the community of Wheeler Springs. It flows briefly east and joins Matilija Creek shortly downstream. Highway 33 largely parallels the North Fork, from the top of Dry Lakes Ridge to the mouth.

Fed by some perennial springs, despite its location in arid terrain, the creek flows year round, and can flood severely following winter storms.

Ecology
  
The name of the Matilija poppy (Romneya) is taken from the Matilija creek canyon. The Matilija Dam was constructed in 1947 on lower Matilija Creek for the purpose of supplying water storage and flood control, blocking access of anadromous Steelhead trout (Oncorhynchus mykiss) to over ten miles of upstream spawning areas. Historically 5,000 steelhead trout used the upper Matilija basin. The Robles Diversion Dam on the Ventura River downstream posed a barrier to trout migration until a $6 million fish ladder was constructed in 2006. Recent genetic analysis of the steelhead in Matilija Creek (both above and below Matilija Dam) has shown them to be of native and not hatchery stocks.

River modifications
The creek has one dam on it, Matilija Dam, built in 1947 to provide flood control and water supply for agricultural and urban uses in Ventura County. The reservoir has now almost completely filled with sediment, rendering it nearly useless. The dam was notched to reduce its height twice in the late 20th century, in order to allow some of the accumulated sediment to flow downstream. It is currently slated for removal.

See also
Rindge Dam, which Malibu Creek filled with sediment like Matilija Dam
Riparian zone restoration

References

External links
Matilija Dam.org

Rivers of Southern California
Rivers of Ventura County, California